Lightpath or Lightpaths may refer to:

 Nelson Street Cycleway, Auckland, New Zealand, in particular that part located on an old motorway off-ramp and named 'Te Ara I Whiti' (Māori for 'Lightpath')
 Optical path, the path taken by light in traversing a system
 Lightpath (optical network), a section of an optical network that light travels through without being modified
 An internet and telephone service provided by Altice USA
 Lightpaths, a 1997 novel by Howard V. Hendrix